The Swiss 1. Liga is the fourth-highest ice hockey league in Switzerland, behind the National League, the Swiss League and the MySports League. The teams compete in three divisions – Eastern Switzerland, Central Switzerland and Western Switzerland.

Participating teams 2017/18

Eastern Switzerland

Central Switzerland

Argovia Stars
EHC Adelboden
EHC Burgdorf
SC Lyss
Red Lions Reinach
SC Unterseen-Interlaken
EHC Zuchwil Regio

Western Switzerland

HC Franches-Montagnes
Genève-Servette HC II
CP Meyrin
HC Monthey-Chablais
EHC Saas Valley
HC Saint-Imier-Sonceboz
HC Sierre
HC Vallée de Joux
HC Villars
HC Yverdon-les-Bains

See also
National League - Switzerland's top-tier professional ice hockey league
Swiss League - Switzerland's second-tier professional ice hockey league

External links
 East Switzerland Division website
 Central Switzerland Division website
 West Switzerland Division website

3